The Index of Multiple Deprivation 2000 (IMD 2000) showed relative levels of social and economic deprivation across all the counties of England at a ward level, the first national study of its kind.

Deprivation across the 8414 wards in the country was assessed, using the following criteria:

 Income
 Employment
 Health
 Education
 Housing
 Access
 Child Poverty

Wards ranking in the most deprived 10 per cent in the country were earmarked for additional funding and assistance.

The five most deprived wards in England were found to be:

 1. Benchill in Manchester.
 2. Speke in Liverpool.
 3. Thorntree in Middlesbrough.
 4. Everton in Liverpool.
 5. Pallister in Middlesbrough.

The five least deprived wards in England were found to be:

 8414. Aldenham East in Hertsmere.
 8413. Chorleywood West in Three Rivers.
 8412. Riverhead in Sevenoaks.
 8411. Hazlemere West in Wycombe.
 8410. Verulam in St Albans.

IMD2000 was the subject of some controversy, and was succeeded by the Indices of deprivation 2004 which abandoned ward-level data and sampled much smaller geographical areas.

References

Health in the United Kingdom
Measurements and definitions of poverty
Medical data sets
Office for National Statistics
Poverty in England
Social statistics data